Memphis Kiddie Park is an 11-ride amusement park located in Brooklyn, Ohio, designed specifically for children and families.

Memphis Kiddie Park opened on May 28, 1952.  The park was one of several designed and opened by Stuart Wintner, who also owned a chain of indoor movie theaters. Wintner and later his son Russell ran the park.

The park is home to the "Little Dipper" roller coaster—the oldest operating steel roller coaster in North America.

The 11 rides at Memphis Kiddie Park are:
Comets (Allan Herschell "Skyfighter" that moves up and down) HL
Jeeps (Cars that spin around)(Allan Herschell) HL
Ferris Wheel (originally San Antonio Roller Works, significantly rebuilt and updated)HL
Boats (Floats around in circles) (Allan Herschell) HL
Pony Carts (Chariot-style cars that travel in a loop) (Allan Herschell) HL
Merry-Go-Round (Allan Herschell, 36-cast aluminum horses)
Train (Travels around the perimeter of the park and Miniature Golf) (Allan Herschell)
Hand Carts (The children power themselves on little carts around a track)(original ride: Hodges Handcar; replaced ca.1995 with Alter Amusements version) HL
Speedway (Motorized race cars that travel around inside the Little Dipper) " HL
Little Dipper roller coaster (Allan Herschell)
Space Shuttles (Smaller version of the Comets, doesn't elevate)(Allan Herschell "Airplanes") HL
Rides that have a HL after them mean that the ride has a height limit. The height limit for those rides is UNDER 50".

In addition to the rides, the park also has a miniature golf course for both kids and adults to enjoy.

References

External links
Memphis Kiddie Park

Amusement parks in Ohio
Buildings and structures in Cuyahoga County, Ohio
1952 establishments in Ohio
Tourist attractions in Cuyahoga County, Ohio
Amusement parks opened in 1952